Patrick Iwosso (born 5 February 1982) is a Republic of the Congo former footballer who is last known to have played as a defender for Vénissieux.

Career

Iwosso started his career with Inter Club, before joining South African side AmaZulu.  After that, he played for Thouars in the French fifth division.

In 2006, Iwosso signed for Ukrainian club Zorya where he made 7 league appearances and scored 0 goals and was known for communicating with the fans during games.

References

External links
 
 
 

Living people
ASM Vénissieux players
Expatriate footballers in Ukraine
Republic of the Congo expatriate sportspeople in Ukraine
Expatriate soccer players in South Africa
Republic of the Congo international footballers
Republic of the Congo expatriate footballers
1982 births
Sportspeople from Brazzaville
FC Zorya Luhansk players
Ukrainian Premier League players
AmaZulu F.C. players
Thouars Foot 79 players
Expatriate footballers in France
Association football defenders
Republic of the Congo expatriate sportspeople in France
Republic of the Congo expatriate sportspeople in South Africa
Republic of the Congo footballers